Puneet Talwar (born 1965 in Washington D.C.) is an American diplomat serving as the United States Ambassador to Morocco. He previously served as the Assistant Secretary of State for Political-Military Affairs from 2014 to November 2015. Talwar served as a top Middle East advisor to Barack Obama and played a central role in the backchannel diplomacy that produced the Iran nuclear deal. Prior to working in the White House, he was a top advisor to then-Senator Joe Biden on the Senate Foreign Relations Committee for twelve years.

Education 
Talwar earned a Bachelor of Science degree from Cornell University and a Master of International Affairs from Columbia University.

Career 
From 1995 to 1999 and again from 2001 to 2008, Talwar served as the Chief Middle East, North Africa, and South Asia Advisor to Joe Biden on the United States Senate Committee on Foreign Relations. Talwar then worked on the Policy Planning Staff of the United States Department of State from 1999 to 2001. Talwar was a foreign policy advisor for the United States House of Representatives, and served as Special Assistant to the President and Senior Director for Iraq, Iran, and the Gulf States on the National Security Council from 2009 to 2014. In 2012, Foreign Policy Magazine named Talwar as one of the 50 most powerful Democrats in foreign policy.

In 2014, Talwar was nominated by Barack Obama to serve as Assistant Secretary of State for Political-Military Affairs. He left office in 2015 and was eventually replaced by R. Clarke Cooper in 2019.

Since leaving government service, Talwar has served as chairman and President of Crest International, a US-based private investment company. He is also a senior advisor at WestExec Advisors, a strategic advisory firm founded by former Obama Administration officials, Michèle Flournoy and Tony Blinken.

In November 2020, Talwar was named a volunteer member of the Joe Biden presidential transition Agency Review Team to support transition efforts related to the United States Department of State.

Ambassador to Morocco
On March 18, 2022, President Joe Biden nominated Talwar as the United States Ambassador to Morocco. Hearings on his nomination were held before the Senate Foreign Relations Committee on July 27, 2022. He was confirmed by the entire Senate via voice vote on September 8, 2022.

References 

1965 births
Living people
Cornell University alumni
School of International and Public Affairs, Columbia University alumni
United States Department of State officials